"Processed Beats" is the third fully released single from English rock band Kasabian. It was released on 11 October 2004 and entered the UK Charts at #17. It was originally released as a demo, as Kasabian's first single, in limited numbers.

Music video 
The music video features the band perform in a warehouse, and later the woods. As well as being their first song to feature Ian Matthews on drums, it is also his first music video appearance, although he is kept in the background due to not yet being an official member, and in the shot of the band going to the woods, he is not seen with them.

Track listing

2003 Original Release

CD Promo
PARADISE 01
 Processed Beats (demo) – 3:16

10" Vinyl
PARADISE 02
 Processed Beats (demo) – 3:16

2004 Reissue

Maxi CD
PARADISE21
 Processed Beats – 3:08
 The Nightworkers – 3:16
 L.S.F. (Live @ Cabinet War Rooms) – 3:28
 Processed Beats (Afrika Bambaataa Remix) – 3:42
 CD-Rom with Processed Beats video, Movement Itinerary and Customisable Wallpaper

Mini CD
PARADISE20
 Processed Beats – 3:08
 The Nightworkers – 3:16

Japan CD
BVCP-29911
 Processed Beats – 3:09
 The Nightworker's – 3:16
 L.S.F. (Live @ Cabinet War Rooms) – 3:30
 Processed Beats (Afrika Bambaataa Remix) – 3:39
 I.D. (Live in Tokyo at Summer Sonic Festival, 8 Aug 2004) – 5:29
 CD-Rom with Processed Beats video

10" Vinyl
PARADISE22
Side A:
 Processed Beats – 3:08
 Ovary Stripe (Remix) – 4:02
Side B:
 Processed Beats (Afrika Bambaataa Remix) – 3:42

Personnel
 Tom Meighan – lead vocals
 Sergio Pizzorno – guitar, backing vocals, synths
 Christopher Karloff – guitar, synths, omnichord
 Chris Edwards – bass
 Ian Matthews – drums

References

External links
 

Kasabian songs
2004 singles
Song recordings produced by Jim Abbiss
2004 songs
Columbia Records singles
Songs written by Sergio Pizzorno
Songs written by Christopher Karloff